Fossil Mountain is located in the Teton Range, within the Jedediah Smith Wilderness of Caribou-Targhee National Forest, U.S. state of Wyoming.

References

Mountains of Wyoming
Mountains of Teton County, Wyoming